The 1956 German football championship was the culmination of the football season in West Germany in 1955-56. Borussia Dortmund were crowned champions for the first time in their second final appearance, having previously lost the 1949 German football championship final to VfR Mannheim.

On the strength of this title, the club participated in the 1956–57 European Cup, where it went out to Manchester United 3–2 on aggregate in the quarter-finals.

Qualified teams
The clubs qualified through the 1955–56 Oberliga season:

Competition

First qualifying round
The four qualified runners-up played two qualifying rounds to determine the three clubs which advanced to the group stage. The deciding game for the third qualified team had to be replayed after a three-all draw after extra time in the first match.

|}

Second qualifying round

|}

Replay

|}

Group 1

Group 2

Final

References

External links
 1955-56 at Weltfussball.de
 Germany - Championship 1956 at RSSSF.com
 German championship 1956 at Fussballdaten.de

1
German football championship seasons